Esther Waters is a British period television series which originally aired on BBC 2 in four episodes from 14 November to 5 December 1964. It is an adaptation of the 1894 novel of the same title by George Moore. Like the novel it focuses on the struggle of Esther Waters who, in Victorian England, is abandoned by her lover when pregnant. Despite the social stigma of being a fallen woman she chooses to raise the child as a single mother.

The novel had previously been made into a 1948 film Esther Waters. A further television adaptation Esther Waters followed in 1977.

Main cast
 Meg Wynn Owen as Esther Waters
 John Bennett as  William Latch
 Pauline Letts as Mrs. Barfield
 Gwendolyn Watts as Margaret Gale
 Daphne Heard as Mrs. Latch
 Gordon Gostelow as Fred Parsons
 Anne Ridler as  Miss Rice
 Carl Bernard as  Mr. Randall
 Blake Butler as  Mr. Ward
 Elizabeth Bell as Sarah
 John Dearth as Esther's father
 Ruth Porcher as Esther's mother
 Tracy Reed as Miss Peggy
 Doris Hare as Mrs. Randall

References

Bibliography
Baskin, Ellen . Serials on British Television, 1950-1994. Scolar Press, 1996.

External links
 

BBC television dramas
1964 British television series debuts
1964 British television series endings
1960s British drama television series
1960s British television miniseries
English-language television shows
Television shows based on British novels
Television series set in the 19th century